Jean Baptiste Julien d'Omalius d'Halloy (17 February 1783 in Liège – 15 January 1875 in Brussels) was a Belgian geologist. He also wrote on races.

Early life and education 

Born in Liège, he was the only son of an ancient and noble family, and his education was carefully directed. After completing his classical studies in his home town he was sent to Paris in 1801 by his parents to avail himself of the social and literary advantages of the metropolis. A lively interest, however, in geology awakened by the works of Buffon, directed his steps to the museums and the Jardin des Plantes.

He visited Paris again in 1803 and 1805, and during these periods attended the lectures of Fourcroy, Lacépède, and Georges Cuvier. His homeward journeys were usually made the occasion of a geological expedition through northern France. As early as 1808 he communicated to the Journal des Mines a paper entitled Essai sur la géologie du Nord de la France. He thus conceived the project of making a series of surveys throughout the whole country. This was furthered by a commission to execute a geological map of the empire which brought with it exemption from military duty.

Work 

He devoted himself energetically to the work and by 1813 had traversed over 15,500 miles in France and portions of Italy. His family had, however, but little sympathy with his geological activity, and persuaded him to give up his expeditions. The map which he had made of France and the neighbouring territories was not published until 1822 and served as a basis for the more detailed surveys of Armand Dufrénoy and Elie de Beaumont. After having served as sous-intendant of the arrondissement of Dinant (1814) and general secretary of the province of Liège (1815), he became in 1815 governor of Namur. He held this office until after the Revolution of 1830. He was elected a member of the Belgian Senate in 1848, became its vice-president in 1851, was made a member of the Academy of Brussels in 1816, and was elected its president in 1850.

Descent with modification 

In the third edition of On the Origin of Species published in 1861, Charles Darwin added a Historical Sketch giving due credit to naturalists who had preceded him in publishing the opinion that species undergo modification, and that the existing forms of life have descended by true generation from pre-existing forms. This included d'Halloy –

Statesman 
As a statesman Halloy had at heart the well-being of the people and, though his duties allowed him little opportunity for extended geological research, he retained a lively interest in his favourite science and engaged occasionally in field work. In his later years he gave much attention to questions of ethnology and philosophy. His death was hastened by the exertions of a scientific expedition undertaken alone in his ninety-first year. He died in Brussels on 15 January 1875.

Pioneer 

Halloy was one of the pioneers of modern geology, and in particular laid the foundation of geological knowledge over wide areas. He made important studies in the Carboniferous districts of Belgium and the Rhine provinces and in the Tertiary deposits of the Paris basin. He was a practicing Catholic during his long and active life, and was characterized by his loyalty and devotion to the Church. He insisted on the harmony between faith and science, making this the subject of his oration on the occasion of the golden jubilee of the Belgian Academy in 1866. Among his published works are: Description géologique des Pays-Bas (1828); Eléments de Géologie (1831); Introduction à la Géologie (1833); Coup d'oeil sur la géologie de la Belgique (1842); Precis elementaire de Géologie (1843); Abrégé de Géologie (1853); Des Races humaines ou Eléments d' Ethnographie (1845). In this last book, Halloy established a racial classification according to skin colour.

Belgian Academy of Sciences 

He was an active member of the Belgian Academy of Sciences from 1816, and served three times as president. He was likewise president of the Geological Society of France in 1852. He studied also in detail the Tertiary deposits of the Paris Basin, and ascertained the extent of the Cretaceous and some of the older strata, which he for the first time clearly depicted on a map (1817). He was distinguished as an ethnologist, and when nearly ninety years of age he was chosen president of the Congress of Pre-historic Archaeology (Brussels, 1872).

In 1816 he was elected first class corresponding member living abroad of the Royal Institute of the Netherlands. When the Institute became the Royal Netherlands Academy of Arts and Sciences he joined as foreign member in 1851.

References

1783 births
1875 deaths
Scientists from Liège
Proto-evolutionary biologists
Belgian geologists
Belgian Roman Catholics
Proponents of scientific racism
Foreign Members of the Royal Society
Members of the French Academy of Sciences
Members of the Royal Netherlands Academy of Arts and Sciences